Ryan Knight may refer to:

Ryan Knight (American football) (born c. 1966), American football running back
Ryan Knight, American guitarist, former member of music group The Black Dahlia Murder and Arsis
Ryan Knight, participant in The Real World: New Orleans
Ryan Knight (Hollyoaks), a fictional character in the British soap opera Hollyoaks

See also 
Ryan Knighton (born 1973), Canadian writer